Hassan Mauris Shamil (born 1906, date of death unknown) was an Egyptian fencer. He competed in the individual and team foil and épée events at the 1936 Summer Olympics.

References

External links
 

1906 births
Year of death missing
Egyptian male foil fencers
Olympic fencers of Egypt
Fencers at the 1936 Summer Olympics
Egyptian male épée fencers